The Minneapolis-Saint Paul Metropolitan Airports Commission (MAC) is the owner and operator of Minneapolis-Saint Paul International Airport in Minnesota as well as six other reliever airports in the Twin Cities region, which primarily provide service to private individuals and businesses, but also have regional transportation service.

The MAC is a governmental agency of the State of Minnesota. Twelve of its commissioners are appointed by the governor. The mayors of the cities of Minneapolis and St. Paul or their designees are also members of the commission. Four of the commissioners must be residents of outstate Minnesota (outside the Twin Cities metropolitan area).

Records

Surveys, studies, planning documents, brochures, proposals, and reports documenting aspects of the commission's activities are available for research use. They include information regarding initial planning, disaster preparedness, studies and proposals for a second major airport site, accessibility to airport facilities, airport noise, the downtown St. Paul airport, Minneapolis-St. Paul International Airport, deregulation, finance and bonding, personnel, parking and traffic potential, public relations, dual track airport planning, and relations with Northwest Airlines, particularly in relation to the public financing for construction of its Hibbing/Duluth repair facilities.

References

External links
Metropolitan Airports Commission

Airports in Minnesota